Stress majorization is an optimization strategy used in multidimensional scaling (MDS) where, for a set of  -dimensional data items, a configuration  of  points in  -dimensional space is sought that minimizes the so-called stress function . The function  is a cost or loss function that measures the squared differences between ideal (-dimensional) distances and actual distances in r-dimensional space. It is defined as:

 

Note that  can be used to specify a degree of confidence in the similarity between points (e.g. 0 can be specified if there is no information for a particular pair).

A configuration  which minimizes  gives a plot in which points that are close together correspond to points that are also close together in the original -dimensional data space.

There are many ways that  could be minimized. For example, Kruskal recommended an iterative steepest descent approach. However, a significantly better (in terms of guarantees on, and rate of, convergence) method for minimizing stress was introduced by Jan de Leeuw. In convex analysis such a function is called a majorizing function. This iterative majorization process is also referred to as the SMACOF algorithm ("Scaling by MAjorizing a COmplicated Function").

The SMACOF algorithm 
The stress function  can be expanded as follows:

 

The third term is bounded by:

 

where  has:

  for 

Proof of this inequality is by the Cauchy-Schwarz inequality, see Borg (pp. 152–153).

Thus, we have a simple quadratic function  that majorizes stress:

 
 

The iterative minimization procedure is then:

 at the  step we set 
 
 stop if  otherwise repeat.

This algorithm has been shown to decrease stress monotonically (see de Leeuw).

Use in graph drawing 
Stress majorization and algorithms similar to SMACOF also have application in the field of graph drawing. That is, one can find a reasonably aesthetically appealing layout for a network or graph by minimizing a stress function over the positions of the nodes in the graph. Here,  is chosen as a trade-off between preserving long- or short-range ideal distances.

References 

Graph drawing
Dimension reduction
Mathematical optimization
Mathematical analysis